Angelesia is a genus of flowering plants belonging to the family Chrysobalanaceae.

Its native range is Thailand to New Guinea.

Species:

Angelesia fusicarpa 
Angelesia palawanensis 
Angelesia splendens

References

Chrysobalanaceae
Chrysobalanaceae genera